Tremaine Johnson is a rapper and producer who is better known by his stage name Tree or MC Tree G. He is responsible for cultivating his own unique sound called "Soul Trap", the fusion of the soul music of the past with present-day rap.

Early life
Tree was brought up in the Cabrini-Green project, the second largest housing project in Chicago, Illinois. He would go to Chicago Salem Church with his grandmother, where he first developed an interest in music and started singing. He attended DuSable High School.

Tree was later forced to move to a different end of the Cabrini-Green projects after his parents separated. He worked odd jobs, like shining shoes at Shedd Aquarium, the Rock N Roll McDonald's, and for the printing company, Forslund Grabowski, in 2001. While at Forslund Grabowski, Tree started to rap, produce and record seriously. He worked for nine years in the women's footwear department at Nordstrom before leaving to officially pursue his music career.

Career
Tree received support from the producers of Project Mayhem and started writing music in the 1990s but didn't release any music until 2010, when he was 27 years-old. He started recording under the nickname his family had for him, Tree, short for Tremaine. In 2010, he released his debut album, The 3rd Floor. After that, he released Sunday School, which made MTV's Top Mixtapes of the Year list in 2012, Sunday School II, 2015's Trap Genius, and 2019's WE Grown NOW. In 2021, he released the album Soul Trap.

Discography

Albums
 The 3rd Floor (2010)
 Sunday School (2012)
 Sunday School II: When Church Lets Out (2013)
 Trap Genius (2015)
 WE Grown NOW. (2019)
 The Wild End (2019) - with Parallel Thought
 Soul Trap (2021)

EPs
 The Lit (2012)
 Trillin (2012) - with 110% Pure
 The @Mctreeg EP (2014)
 #TreeSwag (2014) - with Chris Crack
 Tree + Crack (2014) - with Chris Crack
 VicTree EP (2015) - with Vic Spencer
 I.B. Tree (2016) - with I.B.C.L.A.S.S.I.C.
 The Johnson & Johnson EP (2017) - with Nemesis
 The Tree EP (2017)
 Goat (2018)
 The Blue Tape (2020)

References

American rappers
1983 births
Living people
21st-century American rappers
Rappers from Chicago